"The Distance" is a song by American alternative rock band Cake. Released in August 1996, "The Distance" was the first single from the band's second album, Fashion Nugget, and is considered one of their most popular songs. It was written by the band's guitarist at the time, Greg Brown.

Background

"It is a song about success and failure, and failure of success, really," said singer John McCrea in 2019. "It's a sad song, because there is no success. You can explode into the world with great magnificence, and still feel like the guy underneath the Mickey Mouse head, with the fan batteries that have stopped working properly, and it's dark under there, and everybody wants your autograph."

Brown wanted the guitar riff to be played throughout the entire song, but singer McCrea felt it should be saved for the chorus.

Composition
The song is based around Cake's standard guitar, bass, and drums setup, with flourishes of solo trumpet, and McCrea's characteristically deadpan, driving vocals. The song does not employ McCrea's rhythm guitar, but does feature overlaid synthesized and other non-traditional sounds.

Music video
The video for "The Distance" features footage of the members of the band performing the song in a busy office lobby, mixed with footage of a businessman who inexplicably starts to run off into the sunset; first he runs from his office building (the same one the band is performing in) to the suburbs, then into the country and a forest, and finally into the sea. While the man is running, various people in humorous animal costumes cheer him on. It takes place in downtown San Francisco and other Northern California locations and first aired in September 1996.

Track listing
 "The Distance" – 3:00
 "Multiply the Heartaches" – 2:49
 "Jolene" (live) – 8:25
 "It's Coming Down" – 3:44

Charts

Certifications

In popular culture
 The song's opening lyric, "Reluctantly crouched at the starting line", is prominently featured in the remix "The Starting Line" by Neil Cicierega on his album Mouth Moods.
 The song is also heard in the season 1 Daria episode "The Invitation."

References

Cake (band) songs
1996 singles
1996 songs
Capricorn Records singles
Rap rock songs
Songs written by Greg Brown (rock musician)